Marenj (also Romanized as Mārenj; also known as Malrenj, Mārīnj, and Mārj) is a village in Amirabad Rural District, Muchesh District, Kamyaran County, Kurdistan Province, Iran. At the 2006 census, its population was 1,055, in 270 families. The village is populated by Kurds.

References 

Towns and villages in Kamyaran County
Kurdish settlements in Kurdistan Province